Vovchansk Raion was a raion (district) in Kharkiv Oblast of Ukraine. Its administrative center was the town of Vovchansk. The raion was abolished on 18 July 2020 as part of the administrative reform of Ukraine, which reduced the number of raions of Kharkiv Oblast to seven. The area of Vovchansk Raion was, together with Pechenihy and Zmiiv Raions, merged into Chuhuiv Raion. The last estimate of the raion population was 

At the time of disestablishment, the raion consisted of two hromada: 
 Staryi Saltiv settlement hromada with the administration in the urban-type settlement of Staryi Saltiv;
 Vovchansk urban hromada with the administration in Vovchansk.

Geography
Cities
Vovchansk

Urban-type settlements
Bilyi Kolodiaz
Staryi Saltiv
Vilcha

References

External links

Former raions of Kharkiv Oblast
1923 establishments in Ukraine
Ukrainian raions abolished during the 2020 administrative reform
Chuhuiv Raion